The Men's 1972 USA Outdoor Track and Field Championships took place between June 16-18 at Husky Stadium on the campus of University of Washington in Seattle, Washington. It is the only time this championship has been held in the state of Washington.  The Women's Championships took place at Citizens Field in Canton, Ohio.  The meet was organized by the Amateur Athletic Union.

Results

Men track events

Men field events

Women track events

Women field events

See also
United States Olympic Trials (track and field)

References 

 Results from T&FN
 results

USA Outdoor Track and Field Championships
Usa Outdoor Track And Field Championships, 1972
Track and field
Track and field in Oregon
1972 in sports in Ohio
Track and field in Ohio
Outdoor Track and Field Championships
Outdoor Track and Field Championships
Track and field in Washington (state)

Sports in Ohio